The Cooper Mark II, also known as the T5 (Type 5), was a 500cc (predecessor to Formula 3) open-wheel racing car designed and built by the Cooper Car Company at Surbiton, Surrey, England, in 1948, and was the first production car made by Cooper. It was a successor to 1946 Cooper 500, which was a prototype. 12 cars were built. It was powered by a   JA Prestwich Industries (JAP) 4B Speedway single-cylinder engine, but had the option of being converted to a lengthened wheelbase version, to be able to use a   JA Prestwich Industries (JAP) or Vincent-HRD V-twin. It also notably won the first ever Grand Prix at Silverstone in 1948, competing in the 500 cc class, being driven by Spike Rhiando.

References

Cooper racing cars
1940s cars
Cars of England